Life's Mockery is a 1928 American silent drama film directed by Robert F. Hill and starring Betty Compson. It was produced by independent studio Chadwick Pictures who also distributed.

Cast
Betty Compson as Kit Miller / Isabelle Fullerton
Alec B. Francis as John Fullerton
Russell Simpson as Wolf Miller
Theodore von Eltz as Wade Fullerton
Dorothy Cumming as Gladys Morrison

Preservation
The film survives and is preserved at the French archive Centre national du cinéma et de l'image animée in Fort de Bois-d'Arcy.

References

External links

1928 films
American silent feature films
Films directed by Robert F. Hill
1928 drama films
American black-and-white films
Silent American drama films
1920s American films